Humboldtia laurifolia is a species of plant in the family Fabaceae. It is native to Kerala and Sri Lanka.

References

laurifolia
Flora of Kerala
Flora of Sri Lanka
Vulnerable flora of Asia
Taxonomy articles created by Polbot